York College could refer to:

Canada
York University, Toronto, Ontario

United Kingdom
York College (York), York, England
York College for Girls (1908–1997), York, England
University of York, York, England

United States
York College, City University of New York, Jamaica, New York
York College (Nebraska), York, Nebraska
York College of Pennsylvania, York, Pennsylvania
York County Community College, Wells, Maine
York Technical College, Rock Hill, South Carolina